Bilal Bayazit (born 8 April 1999) is a Dutch professional footballer who plays as a goalkeeper for the Turkish club Kayserispor.

Professional career
Bayazit began his career with the reserves of Vitesse, and was the backup goalkeeper for the senior side. He transferred to Kayserispor on 10 August 2021. He made his professional debut with Kayserispor in a 4–0 Turkish Cup win over Iğdır FK on 1 December 2021. He kept another clean sheet in his second game in a dramatic last-minute win (1-0) over Fenerbahçe on 8 February 2022.

International career
Born in the Netherlands, Bayazit is of Turkish descent. He is a youth international for the Netherlands, having represented the Netherlands U16s and Netherlands U17s.

References

External links
 
 Ons Oranje U16 Profile
 Ons Oranje U17 profile

1999 births
Living people
Footballers from Amsterdam
Dutch footballers
Netherlands youth international footballers
Dutch people of Turkish descent
SBV Vitesse players
Kayserispor footballers
Süper Lig players
Tweede Divisie players
Association football goalkeepers